Iceland participated in the Eurovision Song Contest 2022 in Turin, Italy, with "" performed by . The Icelandic broadcaster  (RÚV) organised the national final  2022 in order to select the Icelandic entry for the contest. The national final consisted of three shows: two semi-finals on 26 February and 5 March 2022 and a final on 12 March 2022.

Iceland was drawn to compete in the first semi-final of the Eurovision Song Contest which took place on 10 May 2022. Performing during the show in position 14, "" was announced among the top 10 entries of the first semi-final and hence qualified to compete in the final. In the final, Iceland placed 23rd with 20 points. It was later revealed that the country placed 10th in the semi-final with 103 points.

Background 
Prior to the 2022 contest, Iceland has participated in the Eurovision Song Contest 37 times since its first entry in 1986. In , Iceland placed fourth in the grand final with the song "10 Years" performed by Daði og Gagnamagnið.

The Icelandic national broadcaster,  (RÚV), broadcasts the event within Iceland and organises the selection process for the nation's entry. Daði og Gagnamagnið won  2020 with "Think About Things". The song was considered one of the favourites to win, however the contest was cancelled due to the COVID-19 pandemic. Daði og Gagnamagnið were subsequently internally re-selected to compete in 2021 with the song "10 Years", finishing in fourth place with 378 points.

Before Eurovision

Söngvakeppnin 2022
 2022 was the national final organised by RÚV in order to select Iceland's entry for the Eurovision Song Contest 2022. It consisted of two semi-finals on 26 February and 5 March 2022 and a final on 12 March 2022.

Format 
In each semi-final, five of the ten competing acts performed, and two entries determined solely by the viewing public through telephone voting progressed to the final. As per the rules of the competition, an additional optional qualifier could be selected by the contest organisers from among the non-qualifying acts, which would also progress to the final. This option was subsequently invoked by the organisers, meaning that a total of five acts qualified for the final.

In the final, two rounds of voting determined the winning song: in the first round, the votes of the viewing public through telephone voting and the votes of a seven-member international jury panel determined two entries which would progress to the second round. The public and jury each accounted for 50% of the result in the first round, with the rankings of each jury member being converted to match the total number of televotes cast by the public. In the second round a further round of televoting was held, with the winner determined by aggregating the results of the first round to the votes received in the second round.

Competing entries 
Between 3 September and 6 October 2021, RÚV opened the period for interested songwriters to submit their entries. Songwriters did not have any particular requirement to meet, and the process was open to all. At the close of submissions, 158 songs had been entered. A selection committee formed under consultation with the Association of Composers (FTT) and the Icelandic Musicians' Union (FÍH) selected the ten competing entries, all of which were revealed on 5 February 2022.

Semi-finals
Two semi-finals took place on 26 February 2022 and 5 March 2022. In each semi-final, five of the ten competing acts performed, and two entries determined solely by the viewing public through telephone voting progressed to the final. In addition to the performances of the competing entries, a number of guest performances also featured during the two shows. The first semi-final featured a performance from the Icelandic electronic rock band GusGus and Margrét Rán, who performed a rendition of the 2009 Icelandic Eurovision entry "Is It True?". The second semi-final featured a performance from Icelandic singer and actress GDRN, who performed the 2003 Icelandic Eurovision entry "Open Your Heart". In addition, an optional qualifier was selected by the contest organisers from among the non-qualifying acts, which also progressed to the final.

Final 
The final took place on 12 March 2022 and featured the four qualifiers and the wildcard from the semi-finals. It was later revealed that the songs in the final would be performed in the language ​​they would be performing in case they represent the country in Eurovision. Thus, three of the finalists, namely Stefan Oli, Sigga, Beta and Elín, and Katla, decided to perform the Icelandic version of their entries, while  performed a bilingual version of their entry in both English and Icelandic, and Amarosis decided to perform their entry in English. In addition to the competing entries, the show was opened by Birgitta Haukdal, together with Katla Margrét Þorgeirsdóttir, Guðjón Davíð Karlsson, Þórey Birgisdóttir, Jón Jónsson, Ragnhildur Steinunn Jónsdóttir, and Þröstur Leó Gunnarsson. Moreover, Daði Freyr, who represented Iceland in the Eurovision Song Contest 2021 together with Gagnamagnið, performed as an interval act. The  Go_A were set to feature as guest performers, however, due to the 2022 Russian invasion of Ukraine resulting in the band's inability to travel to Iceland, the  Tusse performed in the final instead. Both Freyr and Tusse were also part of the jury panel.

At Eurovision 

According to Eurovision rules, all nations with the exceptions of the host country and the "Big Five" (France, Germany, Italy, Spain and the United Kingdom) are required to qualify from one of two semi-finals in order to compete for the final; the top ten countries from each semi-final progress to the final. The European Broadcasting Union (EBU) split up the competing countries into six different pots based on voting patterns from previous contests, with countries with favourable voting histories put into the same pot. On 25 January 2022, an allocation draw was held which placed each country into one of the two semi-finals, as well as which half of the show they would perform in. Iceland was placed into the first semi-final, which was held on 10 May 2022, and was scheduled to perform in the second half of the show.

Once all the competing songs for the 2022 contest had been released, the running order for the semi-finals was decided by the shows' producers rather than through another draw, so that similar songs were not placed next to each other. Immediately after the close of the first semi-final, a press conference was held in which each of the artists drew the half of the final of which they would perform in.

In Iceland, all shows were broadcast on RÚV and RÚV 2, with commentary by Gísli Marteinn Baldursson. The Icelandic spokesperson, who announced the top 12-point score awarded by the Icelandic jury during the final, was Árný Fjóla Ásmundsdóttir, who previously represented Iceland in the Eurovision Song Contest 2021 as a part of Daði og Gagnamagnið.

Semi-final
 took part in technical rehearsals on 1 and 5 May, followed by dress rehearsals on 9 and 10 May. This included the jury show on 9 May where the professional juries of each country watched and voted on the competing entries.

The Icelandic performance featured  and a backing piano singer who happened to be the brother of the three frontwomen. The performance remained intimate and similar to that of the national final, with all three sisters static throughout the song with guitars. Towards the end of the performance, LED light screens in the background grew golden from white.

At the end of the show, Iceland was announced as having finished in the top 10 and subsequently qualifying for the grand final. This marked the third consecutive qualification to the final for Iceland. It was later revealed that  placed tenth in the semi-final, receiving a total of 103 points: 39 points from the televoting and 64 points from the juries.

Final
Shortly after the first semi-final, a winners' press conference was held for the ten qualifying countries. As part of this press conference, the qualifying artists took part in a draw to determine which half of the grand final they would subsequently participate in. This draw was done in the order the countries appeared in the semi-final running order. Iceland was drawn to compete in the second half. Following this draw, the shows' producers decided upon the running order of the final, as they had done for the semi-finals.

 once again took part in dress rehearsals on 13 and 14 May before the final, including the jury final where the professional juries cast their final votes before the live show. They performed a repeat of their semi-final performance during the final on 14 May. Iceland placed twenty-third in the final, scoring 20 points: 10 points from the televoting and 10 points from the juries.

Voting 

Below is a breakdown of points awarded to Iceland during the first semi-final and final. Voting during the three shows involved each country awarding two sets of points from 1-8, 10 and 12: one from their professional jury and the other from televoting. The exact composition of the professional jury, and the results of each country's jury and televoting were released after the final; the individual results from each jury member were also released in an anonymised form. The Icelandic jury consisted of Erna, Kristján Gíslason, Lydía Grétarsdóttir, Stefán Hjörleifsson, and Sóley. In the first semi-final, Iceland finished in tenth place out of seventeen entries, marking Iceland's third consecutive qualification to the grand final.

Points awarded to Iceland

Points awarded by Iceland

Detailed voting results
The following members comprised the Icelandic jury:
 Erna – Singer-songwriter
 Kristján Gíslason – Music producer, singer, represented Iceland in the Eurovision Song Contest 2001
 Lydía Grétarsdóttir – Singer-songwriter
 Stefán Hjörleifsson – Musician, stage director
 Sóley – Singer-songwriter, instrumentalist, producer

References

External links 
 

2022
Countries in the Eurovision Song Contest 2022
Eurovision